Existential Psychotherapy can refer to:

 Existential psychotherapy, an approach in the field of psychotherapy
 Existential Psychotherapy (book), a book (1980) on existential psychotherapy by Irvin D. Yalom